The Bolgrad palace bombing occurred on 13 December, 1921 when a bomb was thrown into the Siguranța palace located in Bolgrad, Kingdom of Romania, resulting in the deaths of 100 soldiers and police officers. The attackers were suspected of being based in Bessarabia.

References

Terrorist incidents in Romania
Terrorist incidents in the 1920s
1921 in Romania